Premium Blend was a stand-up comedy series created and directed by Paul Miller that aired on the American cable television channel Comedy Central from 1997 to 2005. In 2005 the show was changed, and now known as "Live at Gotham".

The show was born out of Comedy Central's attempts to find new comedy stars. These "attempts" were $1,000 to $10,000 dollar productions that allowed unnoticed comedians to share their material. Premium Blend acted as a showcase where most of the material and bits were shown.

Overview
Every year since its premier in 1997, the program featured a well-known stand up comedian as an emcee who introduced four or five lesser known comedians looking for a big break on television. The host and guests would change every year. Each comedian presented a short set of jokes, which was edited to last about five minutes on the airing of the show.

Many alumni have gone on to have their own Comedy Central Presents specials or further acclaim, including Mitch Hedberg, Stephen Lynch, Demetri Martin, Dane Cook, B. J. Novak, Anthony Jeselnik, Paul F. Tompkins, Darrell Hammond, Mike Birbiglia, Greer Barnes, Wayne Federman, Daniel Tosh, Gabriel Iglesias, Pete Holmes, and Ron White.

Hosts
Each year the show would get a new comedian to serve as host for each of the season's ten episodes. The hosts were:
 Kathy Griffin (1997)
 Jim Breuer (1998)
 Tommy Davidson (1999)
 Harland Williams (2000)
 David Alan Grier (2001)
 Wanda Sykes (2002)
 D.L. Hughley (2003)
 Jamie Kennedy (2004)
 Damon Wayans (2005)

See also
 Comedy Central Presents

References

External links
 

Comedy Central original programming
1990s American stand-up comedy television series
2000s American stand-up comedy television series
1997 American television series debuts
2005 American television series endings
English-language television shows